Senator Kimball may refer tp:

Alanson M. Kimball (1827–1913), Wisconsin State Senate
Art Kimball (1941–2014), Utah State Senate
Bill Kimball (1908–1962), Arizona State Senate
Clem F. Kimball (1868–1928), Iowa State Senate
John Kimball (politician, born 1821) (1821–1913), New Hampshire State Senate
John Kimball (politician, born 1796) (1796–1884), Vermont State Senate